CCAG may refer to:

Catalogus Codicum Astrologorum Graecorum, a collection of ancient Greek texts concerning astrology
Confederation Centre Art Gallery, a art museum in Charlottetown, Prince Edward Island, Canada
Connecticut Citizen Action Group, a political advocacy group in the US state of Connecticut